Innertkirchen MIB railway station, is a railway station in the municipality of Innertkirchen, in the Swiss canton of Bern. It is the eastern terminus of the  Meiringen–Innertkirchen line of the Meiringen-Innertkirchen-Bahn (MIB).

Services 
 the following services stop at Innertkirchen MIB:

References

External links 
 
 

Railway stations in the canton of Bern
Meiringen-Innertkirchen-Bahn stations